Noson Lawen is a Welsh language Welsh film made in 1949. It is based on a story by Sam Jones, directed by Marc Lloyd. It starred Meredydd Evans, Ieuan Rhys Williams, Nellie Hodgkins and Robert Roberts as the main roles respectively.

Plot
Ifan (Meredydd Evans), a farmer's son living in the Welsh hills, dreams of an academic career. His father (Ieuan Rhys Williams) his mother (Nellie Hodgkins) and his wife, Gwen, (Meriel Jones) use nearly all of their money to pay for him to go to a university and are terrified that he may fail his exam, and it will all have been for nothing. As Ifan's father counts the money left for the umpteenth time, the postmistress (Emily Davies) appears with startling news: Ifan has passed with flying colours.

After the ceremony, Ifan introduces his friends, Emlyn (Cledwyn Jones) and Hywel (Robin Williams) to his mother, father and lively grandfather (Robert Roberts). The boys eventually come to work on the farm.

A party follows, and Ifan, Emlyn and Hywel sing a composition by Meredydd Evans himself (Moo Moo, Me Me, Cwac Cwac) and call themselves Triawd y Buarth. Then the Grandfather gets up on the stage and begins dancing around like a lunatic singing with an incredible voice.

Cast
 Meredydd Evans as Ifan
 Ieuan Rhys Williams as Father
 Nellie Hodgkins as Mother
 Meriel Jones as Gwen
 Robert Roberts as Grandfather
 Cledwyn Jones as Emlyn
 Robin Williams as Hywel
 Emily Davies as Postmistress

1949 films
Welsh-language films
Welsh films
British black-and-white films